Nicolle Marie Bruderer Cofiño (born 15 August 1993) is a Guatemalan professional racing cyclist, who most recently rode for UCI Women's Continental Team .

Career
A keen participant in multiple sports in her childhood, she took up cycle racing after trying track cycling with the encouragement of her father in her senior year of high school. She then became a student at the University of Colorado Boulder, combining undergraduate studies in Business Management with competing for the University in road cycling, as well as representing her country on the track during the last two years of her course. She competed for Guatemala at the 2015 Pan American Games.

She rode in the women's road race at the 2016 UCI Road World Championships, finishing in 38th place. In November 2016, she was named as a member of the  team for the 2017 season. She became Guatemalan national champion for the road race and time trial in 2017, and successfully defended her time trial title the following year.

Major results

2011
 1st  Time trial, National Junior Road Championships
2012
 8th Overall Vuelta Femenina a Guatemala
2013
 3rd  Scratch, Bolivarian Games
2014
 Copa Guatemala de Ciclismo de Pista
1st Individual pursuit
1st Omnium
2015
 3rd Overall Tulsa Tough
 8th Overall Tour of America's Dairyland
2017
 National Road Championships
1st  Road race
1st  Time trial
2018
 National Road Championships
1st  Time trial
2nd Road race
 Central American and Caribbean Games
8th Road race
8th Time trial
 10th Overall Armed Forces Association Cycling Classic

References

External links
 
 

1993 births
Living people
Guatemalan female cyclists
Sportspeople from Guatemala City
University of Colorado Boulder alumni
Cyclists at the 2015 Pan American Games
Pan American Games competitors for Guatemala